FWM may refer to:
 Coventry Climax FWM, a British pump engine
 The Fabric Workshop and Museum, in Philadelphia, Pennsylvania, United States
 Fairway Market, an American grocery chain
 Fast Web Media, a British digital marketing firm
 Four-wave mixing
 "FVM", a song by American rapper Lil Yachty from the 2018 album Lil Boat 2
 Several speaker systems featuring wOOx Technology